"Feel Me" is a song by American singer Selena Gomez from the deluxe and vinyl version of her third studio album Rare (2020). It was released alongside the album's vinyl release date. The song was debuted on her Revival Tour and was not originally planned to be released. However, due to the song's popularity & high demand from fans, the song was announced for a February 2020 release date. It was released officially on February 21, 2020 through streaming services and digital copies. It also appears on the vinyl & deluxe editions of the album. The song received airplay by Radio Disney, but achieved biggest success only in Poland, topping the chart. Musically, it is a dance track with ambient house influences.

Credits and personnel 
Credits adapted from Tidal.

 Selena Gomez – lead vocals, backing vocals, songwriter
 Phil Phever – producer, songwriter, vocal producer, programmer, backing vocals, bass guitar, keyboards
 J. Mills – producer, songwriter
 Kurtis McKenzie – producer, songwriter
 Ammar Malik – songwriter, backing vocals
 Ross Golan – songwriter, backing vocals
 Lisa Scinta – songwriter, backing vocals
 Jacob Kasher – songwriter
 Tony Maserati – mixer
 Najeeb Jones – assistant mixer
 Chris Gehringer – mastering engineer
 Will Quinnell – mastering engineer

Charts

Weekly charts

Year-end charts

Certifications

Release history

See also
 List of number-one singles of 2020 (Poland)

References 

Selena Gomez songs
2020 singles
2016 songs
Interscope Records singles
Number-one singles in Poland
Songs written by Selena Gomez
Songs written by Jacob Kasher
Songs written by Ammar Malik
Songs written by Ross Golan
Songs written by Kurtis Mckenzie